CCIR System D is an analog broadcast television system used in Bulgaria, Latvia, Lithuania, Poland, Romania, Slovakia, Czech Republic, Hungary and the People's Republic of China paired with PAL colour, and in Mongolia, Kyrgyzstan, North Korea, Tajikistan, Turkmenistan, Uzbekistan, Armenia, Azerbaijan, Georgia, Kazakhstan, Moldova, Russia, Ukraine and Belarus paired with SECAM colour. 

Initially known as the I.B.T.O. 625-line system this was the first 625-line system, developed by Mark Iosifovich Krivosheev in 1948, and later associated with the SECAM and PAL color systems. Used on VHF only in most countries, it's usually combined with System K on UHF. In China it is used for both VHF and UHF.

Specifications 
The general specifications for System D are listed below:

Television channels were arranged as follows:

 The original assignments of channels 25 to 57 were 2 MHz higher in frequency until c.1984. Channels 58 to 62 were deleted at this time.

See also 

Broadcast television systems
Television transmitter
Transposer

References

External links 
 ITU, Characteristics of television systems
 World Analogue Television Standards and Waveforms

ITU-R recommendations
Television technology
D, System
Broadcast engineering
CCIR System
Television in the Soviet Union